Peter Arthur Tancred (born 20 October 1949) is a male former athlete, and professional strongman from England.

Athletics career
Tancred was born on 20 October 1949 in Quetta, Balochistan, Pakistan, the younger brother of Bill Tancred. In Britain he became affiliated to Queens Park Harriers in London. He competed at the 1976 Montreal Olympics. Domestically, he was the British Champion (AAA) twice (in 1977 and 1978), following in the footsteps of his brother Bill who won the title seven times.

He represented England in the discus event, at the 1978 Commonwealth Games in Edmonton, Alberta, Canada. Four years later he represented England in the discus event, at the 1982 Commonwealth Games in Brisbane, Queensland, Australia.

Strongman career
In 1984 he competed in Britain's Strongest Man coming second behind Alan Crossley and two years later won Britain's Most Powerful Man, the replacement for the absent Britain's Strongest Man competition that year.

National titles
UK Championships
Discus throw: 1977, 1980, 1983
AAA Championships
Discus throw: 1977, 1978

References

External links
 Profile at The Power of Ten
 Profile at sports-reference.com

1949 births
Living people
People from Quetta
British strength athletes
English strength athletes
English male discus throwers
British male discus throwers
Olympic athletes of Great Britain
Athletes (track and field) at the 1976 Summer Olympics
Athletes (track and field) at the 1978 Commonwealth Games
Athletes (track and field) at the 1982 Commonwealth Games
Commonwealth Games competitors for England